Feeld (previously called 3nder) is a location-based online dating application for iOS and Android that facilitates communication between people interested in ethical non-monogamy, polyamory, casual sex, kink, swinging, and other alternative relationship models and sexual preferences. According to a review from The New York Times, over a third of users are on the app with a partner, and 45 percent identify as something other than heterosexual.

3nder was launched in the UK in July 2014 and in the US in 2015. As of August 1, 2016, it had had over 1.6M downloads on iOS and its users make 10 million connections a month. Major updates to the interface were released December 2017 then in August 2022. 

Feeld is developed by Feeld Ltd., an independent remote startup company founded in 2014 by Bulgarian-born designer Dimo Trifonov.

History
Trifonov conceived the app after his girlfriend Ana Kirova told him that she had feelings for other people. Once the concept was developed, Trifonov bought a $15 online template to create a holding page and saw immediate demand.

Feeld (initially known as 3nder) received its first seed round from UK-based group, Haatch.  The app was launched as 3nder in the UK in July 2014 and in the US in 2015. In October 2015, 3nder Ltd. was awarded $500,000 in seed funding from a pair of unnamed angel investors.

In May 2016, Tinder's parent company Match Group (a part of IAC) sued 3nder Ltd., alleging trademark infringement over its name. Match Group "wants its smaller competitor to shut down and erase its presence from the web entirely to avoid ‘confusion’ between the two apps, claiming the alleged similarity gives 3nder an ‘unfair advantage’", based on the "supposed pronunciation of 3nder". In August 2016, the app was renamed Feeld.

Dimo Trifonov was CEO until March 2021, when Ana Kirova took over.

Operation
The basic app is free to use to match with and message with other members, with optional in-app purchases available to obtain additional features.

Members discreetly sign into the app using their email address, Sign in with Apple, or Facebook. They build their profile, choosing between 20 sexuality and 19 gender options, and can pair their account with their partner, if they have one. Users can then choose who they'd like to see (singles, couples, genders) and refine their search based on geographical search area, age, relationship type and sexual preferences. The app then presents other users' profiles to look at. 

Liking or Disliking indicate interest or disinterest in another's profile, and uniquely for dating apps, users can decide to “skip” a profile to make a choice later. When two users like each other, they become "Connections" and can start to message each other. 

As well as showing other members around them, the app also offers the ability to visit and meet members in other cities through "Cores". It also offers Virtual Cores as a way to connect over like-minded interests, regardless of geographical location.

In-app purchases 
A paid subscription called Majestic offers additional features called Who Likes You, Filter by Desires, Incognito and Private Photos; it also gives members one complimentary Ping per day. Incognito allows members to hide from others members they haven't yet Liked, providing additional privacy; members who have logged in with Facebook can also opt to hide their profile from their Facebook friends.

Members may also send "Pings", to immediately notify another member of their interest without having to wait for the other person to see them and like them back. Pings can be acquired as in-app purchases.

There is also a paid feature called "Uplift", which allows members to be shown ahead of other profiles in their area for some time, thus decreasing the time it will take to connect with other members.

See also

Timeline of online dating services
Comparison of online dating services

References

External links

Online dating for specific interests
Geosocial networking
Mobile social software
Proprietary software
2014 software
Online dating services of the United Kingdom